Tatiana Yuryevna Kashirina (born 24 January 1991) is a Russian Olympic weightlifter, Olympic silver medalist, five time World Champion and eight time European Champion competing in the +90 kg and +75 kg categories until 2018 and +87 kg starting in 2018 after the International Weightlifting Federation reorganized the categories.

Career

Kashirina won the world championship five times (2010, 2013, 2014, 2015, and 2018) in the +75 kg and +87 kg categories.
She won the silver medal at the 2012 Summer Olympics in the Woman's +75 kg category with a total of 332 kg and the world record in a snatch (151 kg).

Before weight classes were restructured, Tatiana held the clean and jerk world record of 193 kg as well as the snatch world record of 155 kg and total world record of 348 kg. Kashirina has set 23 senior world records throughout her weightlifting career.

She also held all three world records in the Junior +75 kg class; the snatch world record of 148 kg the clean and jerk world record of 181 kg as well as the total world record of 327 kg.

Doping sanctions
In September 2006, Kashirina was suspended from competition for two years after failing an anti-doping control. In December 2020 she was again provisionally suspended as a consequence of anti-doping investigations, missing the 2021 European Weightlifting Championships and the 2020 Summer Olympics in Tokyo.

Major results

References

External links
 
 
 
 
 Tatiana Kashirina at The-Sports.org

1991 births
Living people
Russian female weightlifters
Russian sportspeople in doping cases
Doping cases in weightlifting
Olympic weightlifters of Russia
Olympic medalists in weightlifting
Olympic silver medalists for Russia
Weightlifters at the 2012 Summer Olympics
Medalists at the 2012 Summer Olympics
World record holders in Olympic weightlifting
World Weightlifting Championships medalists
European Weightlifting Championships medalists
Universiade medalists in weightlifting
Universiade gold medalists for Russia
Medalists at the 2013 Summer Universiade
Sportspeople from Moscow Oblast
People from Noginsk
21st-century Russian women